General interest may refer to:
 Interest (emotion), to the general public
 Common good
 Public interest

See also
 General interest channel